Hartwell de la Garde Grissell (1839–1907) was a papal chamberlain and the founder of the Oxford University Newman Society.

Education

Grissell was born in 1839 as the son of Thomas Grissell, a prosperous public works contractor. He was educated at Harrow School and in 1859 matriculated to Oxford University as a commoner of Brasenose College.

According to Walter Bradford Woodgate, a contemporary at Brasenose with Grissell and the founder of Vincent's Club (of which Grissell was a member), he was "a non-athlete, but ... popular". During his time at University Grissell came under the influence of the leading tractarian, Dr. Henry Parry Liddon. He became increasingly involved with the Anglican High Church movement and was admitted to the Brotherhood of the Holy Trinity, a movement to promote High Church principles within the University.

Conversion
At Oxford Grissell also developed a strong interest in ecclesiastical ritual. He came to believe that the Book of Common Prayer had its roots in the Catholic liturgy and argued for greater ritualism in Anglican worship. In 1865 he published a work called Ritual Inaccuracies in which he attempted to "bring the rubrics of the Protestant Communion Service into line with those of the Roman Missal". Reminiscing about this period of his life he wrote:  

Whilst working on his book Grissell came into contact with a number of Catholic priests and developed a leaning towards Roman Catholicism. Under the direction of Fr. Edward Caswall, a priest of the Birmingham Oratory, Grissell began to read Catholic works. Writing in the year of his death, he recalled his conversion:

Grissell was received into the Catholic Church on 2 March 1868 by Henry Edward Manning, the Archbishop of Westminster.

Papal Chamberlain

In 1869 he moved to Rome, where he served as Cameriere (a Chamberlain of Honour) to Pope Pius IX. The Cameriere wore a Spanish-style costume with cape and sword and had the duty of attending upon the pope during ecclesiastical and state functions. With his love of ritual Grissell relished life at the papal court. Writing in later life he reminisced:

The temporal power of the pope ended in 1870, when Victor Emmanuel II seized Rome, but Grissell continued to serve under Pius IX and his two immediate successors, Leo XIII and Pius X. He was rewarded for his service by being created a Knight Commander of the Order of St. Gregory the Great and, in 1898, one of the four Papal Chamberlains di numero, an honour usually reserved to the Roman nobility. Writing from Rome in 1900, Oscar Wilde referred to Grissell as a stalwart of the conservative Papal Court:

Whilst residing in Rome Grissell amassed a vast collection of relics and sacred curios, including a portion of the Crown of Thorns and the entire body of St. Pacificus. The centrepiece of the collection was the reputedly miraculous image of the Madonna called 'Mater Misericordia' (now housed in the Oxford Oratory and popularly known as 'Our Lady of Oxford'), to which Pius IX granted indulgences at Grissell's request. Besides being an expert in matters liturgical, Grissell was a noted numismatician and was elected to a fellowship of the Society of Antiquaries of London.

For Oscar Wilde, Grissell was merely "the withered eunuch of the Vatican Latrines".

Newman Society

When not serving at the papal court, Grissell resided at 60 High Street in Oxford. Here he set up a private oratory, which was frequented by many early convert members of Oxford University. In 1877 he suggested the possibility of establishing a society for the University's Catholics and in the following year this idea the Oxford University Newman Society was founded as the 1888 Oxford University Catholic Club. Roman Catholics had only recently been readmitted to the University and their presence remained controversial. In 1883 Grissell was accused of proselytising and had to be escorted from Pembroke College whilst a mob of undergraduates hurled missiles and shouted 'No-popery' taunts at him. Nevertheless, Grissell continued to promote Catholicism within the University and he was influential in persuading Leo XIII to lift the papal ban on Catholics attending the English universities; this resulted in the foundation of Oxford University's Catholic Chaplaincy.

Grissell died in Rome on 10 June 1907, leaving his relic collection in trust to the Catholic Archdiocese of Birmingham, with the proviso that it be housed within a special chapel within the church of St. Aloysius Gonzaga in Oxford. He also bequeathed a notable collection of papal coins to the Ashmolean Museum.

To mark the centenary of his death in 2007, the Oxford University Newman Society mounted an exhibition commemorating his life and times, which was held in his Oxford alma mater, Brasenose College.

References

Additional sources
Grissell Papers, Oxford Oratory Archive, 25 Woodstock Road, Oxford
'Hartwell de la Garde Grissell, Esq, MA, Brasenose College, Oxford' in J. Godfrey Rupert, Roads to Rome: Being Personal Records of Some of the More Recent Converts to the Catholic Faith (Kegan Paul, Trench, Trubner & Co, 1908).
Hartwell de la Garde Grissell, Ritual Inaccuracies (J. Masters & Co, 1865)
Hartwell de la Garde Grissell, Sede Vacante, being a Diary written during the Conclave of 1903, with additional Notes on the Accession and Coronation of Pius X (James Parker & Co, 1903).
George Andrew Beck, The English Catholics, 1850–1950: essays to commemorate the centenary of the restoration of the hierarchy of England and Wales (Burns & Oates, 1950, p. 301)
Judith F. Champ, William Bernard Ullathorne, 1806–1889: A different kind of monk (Gracewing, 2006, p. 447)
Paul R. Deslandes, Oxbridge men: British masculinity and the undergraduate experience, 1850–1920 (Indiana University Press, 2005, p. 212)
Walter Drumm, The Old Palace: The Catholic Chaplaincy at Oxford. (Veritas, 1991)
John Evans, Numismatic Chronicle and Journal of the Royal Numismatic Society Vol VII (Read Books, 2006, p. 35)
Oscar Wilde, Selected Prose of Oscar Wilde (Read Books, 2006, p. 158)

1839 births
1907 deaths
People educated at Harrow School
Alumni of Brasenose College, Oxford
English Roman Catholics
Converts to Roman Catholicism from Anglicanism